Bernhard Graubart (born 22 December 1888) was an Austrian football player. He was born in Bolechów. He played club football for DFC Prag, and internationally for the Austria national football team. He competed at the 1912 Summer Olympics in Stockholm.

References

External links
 

1888 births
Year of death unknown
Austrian footballers
Austria international footballers
Footballers at the 1912 Summer Olympics
Olympic footballers of Austria
Association football defenders
DFC Prag players
People from Oława County